The Grand Canyon Antelopes men's basketball team represents Grand Canyon University in Phoenix, Arizona. They are a member of the Western Athletic Conference (WAC).  they are led by head coach Bryce Drew and play their home games at the GCU Arena. They made the jump to NCAA Division I and joined the WAC on July 1, 2013. 

During their time as a member of the NAIA, they were national champions in 1975, 1978, and 1988.

In 2021, the program made its first Division I NCAA tournament as a number 15 seed, but they were defeated by Iowa in the first round.

Postseason

NCAA Division I Tournament results
Grand Canyon has appeared in two NCAA Tournaments. Their combined record is 0–2.

NCAA Division II Tournament results
The Lopes have appeared in ten NCAA Division II Tournaments. Their combined record is 5–10.

NAIA Tournament results
The Lopes have appeared in 11 NAIA Tournaments. Their combined record is 18–8 and are three time NAIA national champions (1975, 1978, 1988).

CIT results
The Lopes have appeared in three Division I CollegeInsider.com Postseason Tournament (CIT) Tournaments. Their combined record is 2–3.

CBI results
The Lopes have appeared in the Division I College Basketball Invitational (CBI) two times. Their combined record is 0–2.

Record year-by-year

* Ineligible for NCAA Tournament during transition to Division I from 2013–2016 seasons
 Totals updated through the end of the 2011–2012 school year.

Antelopes in the NBA
2 former Grand Canyon players have played at least one game in the NBA.

References

External links